Qaranqu Darreh (also Romanized as Qarānqū Darreh; also known as Gharanghoo Dareh and Qarān Qadreh) is a village in Mehraban-e Sofla Rural District, Gol Tappeh District, Kabudarahang County, Hamadan Province, Iran. At the 2006 census, its population was 456, in 99 families.

References 

Populated places in Kabudarahang County